Thesium ebracteatum is a species of flowering plant belonging to the family Santalaceae.

Its native range is Northern Central and Eastern Europe to Western Siberia.

References

Santalaceae